John Desmond Dillon (24 March 1921 in Westbourne – 17 October 1988 in Hampshire) was a British sailor. He won a silver medal in the 5.5 metre class at the 1956 Summer Olympics.

References 
 

1921 births
1988 deaths
British male sailors (sport)
Olympic sailors of Great Britain
Olympic silver medallists for Great Britain
Olympic medalists in sailing
Sailors at the 1952 Summer Olympics – 5.5 Metre
Sailors at the 1956 Summer Olympics – 5.5 Metre
Medalists at the 1956 Summer Olympics
People from Westbourne, West Sussex
20th-century British people